K-31 is a  long state highway in the U.S. state of Kansas. K-31 is signed as east–west from US-69 in Fulton to US-59 west of Kincaid and is signed as north–south from US-59 west of Kincaid to K-99 west of Harveyville. K-31 runs diagonally southeast–northwest, connecting small towns in east-central Kansas.

Route description

K-31 begins at a diamond interchange with U.S. Highway 69 (US-69) near Fulton in Bourbon County and heads west on a two-lane road to Mapleton. In Garnett, K-31 leaves US-59 to the west and heads towards Harris where it turns north, again. It turns west at the Franklin County line and overlaps the border until it enters Coffey County, where it continues west toward Waverly. Leaving the town, K-31 heads north again toward Interstate 35 (I-35), and Melvern. It shares a short wrong-way concurrency with I-35 before arriving in Melvern, where it once again turns west. The highway begins a  concurrency with US-75, where it heads toward, and passes through Lyndon. North of the city, K-31 again turns west toward Osage City. It begins a  concurrency with US-56 north of the town and travels north to Burlingame, where it leaves US-56 and heads west toward Harveyville. After passing through Harveyville, K-31 terminates at K-99 in rural Wabaunsee County.

Almost all of K-31's alignment is maintained by KDOT. The entire brick section within Burlingame is maintained by the city. The section of K-31 in Osage City from K-170 to slightly east of 9th Street is maintained by the city.

History

The majority of K-31 has followed the same route since its creation. Minor adjustments were made when I-35 was built, and K-31 was rerouted through Melvern.

The junction with K-268 and US-75 was formerly a four-way intersection. From January 2004 to August 2009, there were a total of 24 crashes, which included one fatality and 15 that resulted in injuries. Residents of the surrounding communities requested a "safer type of intersection." Then in late Fall of 2013, work began to reconstruct the intersection as a roundabout. On November 17, 2014, the new roundabout at the eastern terminus opened to unrestricted traffic. The project was fully completed by the end of December. Smoky Hill LLC from Salina, was the primary contractor on the $2.541 million roundabout project. On August 9, 2018, a tractor-trailer travelling southbound on US-75 crashed into the roundabout. The trucks fuel tank was damaged and spilled about 70 gallons of diesel fuel. K-31 and US-75 traffic was reduced to one lane for about four hours after the crash.

Major intersections

References

External links

Kansas Department of Transportation State Map
KDOT: Historic State Maps

031
Transportation in Bourbon County, Kansas
Transportation in Linn County, Kansas
Transportation in Anderson County, Kansas
Transportation in Osage County, Kansas
Transportation in Wabaunsee County, Kansas